Raymonde Folco is a Canadian politician, member of the Liberal Party of Canada. She represented the Quebec riding of Laval—Les Îles in the House of Commons of Canada through 5 successive parliaments from 1997 to 2011, when she left politics.

Born in Paris, she received a Bachelor of Arts (History) from the University of Melbourne (Australia), a Baccalauréat Spécialisé in Linguistics from the Université du Québec à Montréal, and a Master of Arts in Applied Linguistics from Concordia University (Montreal).

This agency's role is to advise the government on matters relating to the immigration and integration of ethnic minorities.

In 1996–97 she acted as Commissioner with the Immigration and Refugee Board of Canada, an independent administrative tribunal, responsible for making well-reasoned decisions on the status of persons seeking refugee status in Canada, in accordance with the law.

While holding that position, she was recruited to the Liberal Party of Canada and ran for the House of Commons of Canada as candidate for the Quebec riding of Laval East in 1993, but lost to Maud Debien.

In 1997, Folco won the Federal Liberal nomination for the riding of Laval West. There, she was elected in the 1997 and 2000 general elections, then reelected in 2004, 2006, and 2008 for the newly-formed riding of Laval—Les Îles.

Political career 

Folco began her career as a lecturer in Jamaica and Australia, and as a politician served on a number of diplomatic or quasi-diplomatic foreign missions: Algeria, Timor Este, Haiti, Central African Republic, Republic of Congo, Kuwait, Côte d'Ivoire, and Chiapas (Mexico).

From 1999 to 2003 she represented the Canadian Liberal Party at the Liberal International, where she was elected treasurer, then vice-president.

After serving five terms as MP of Laval-Ouest and Laval-Les Îles, Folco retired undefeated from politics in 2011, choosing not to run in the 2011 general elections.

During her time in Parliament Folco has held several leadership roles that have focused on immigration and women:  elected Vice-chair of the Permanent Committee on Immigration, Chair of the Liberal Caucus on immigration, Co-chair Women’s Day at the Liberal Party National Congresses 2003 and 1994.

From 2004 to 2011 she was elected Chair of the Standing Committee on Human Resources. In 2000 she was appointed Parliamentary Secretary to the Minister of Human Resources, with special emphasis on immigration and labour markets and chaired the Quebec Liberal Caucus.

In Opposition, she was named  Official Opposition Critic for immigration from 2006–7 and travelled extensively to advocate for greater coordination between Federal and Provincial legislations and regulations on labour market and immigration.

She was frequently called upon to deal directly with foreign governments, as Chair of the Parliamentary Association for the Caribbean, and from 2006 to 2011 as Official Liberal Critic for La Francophonie.

She was elected vice-chair of the Inter-American Parliamentary Group on Population and Development (IAPG) where, under her chairmanship, the Canadian Association of Parliamentarians for Population and Development (CAPPD) organized and hosted the 2010 Global Annual Parliamentarians' Summit: Balancing the Scales of Women’s Lives in the Countdown to 2015.

After politics 

Since her departure from Federal politics, Folco has remained active and a prominent supporter of the Liberal Party of Canada.

She has travelled to Kuwait, Dubai, Abu Dhabi, and Vancouver, giving a series of lectures dealing with Women in Politics, Immigration, language legislation in Canada.

Folco worked as a consultant for the National Democratic Institute (NDI) as Senior Program Manager for Gender Programming in Mali and with UNWomen, as Senior Election Expert in preparation for the general elections.

Electoral record

October 2008, Laval—Les Îles

January 2006, Laval—Les Îles

References

External links
Raymonde Folco

Living people
Politicians from Paris
Women members of the House of Commons of Canada
French emigrants to Canada
Liberal Party of Canada MPs
Members of the House of Commons of Canada from Quebec
Université du Québec à Montréal alumni
Women in Quebec politics
Concordia University alumni
University of Melbourne alumni
21st-century Canadian politicians
21st-century Canadian women politicians
Year of birth missing (living people)